Dos meseros majaderos is a 1966 Mexican comedy film starring Viruta and Capulina.

External links

Mexican comedy films
1960s Mexican films